Fenan Salčinović (born 26 June 1987) is a Bosnian footballer.

He has one cap for the Bosnia and Herzegovina national football team, earned in a match against Japan on 30 January 2008.

Club career
He started his career in 2004 for Čelik and he stayed there until 2009. After Čelik he played for Lech Poznań, Sandefjord Fotball, HŠK Zrinjski Mostar and HNK Rijeka. 

On 5 September 2012, Salčinović signed for FK Olimpik Sarajevo after leaving Rijeka. Olimpik however wasn't able to pay his wages so he was released from his contract in January. On 12 March 2013, Salčinović returned to Sandefjord.

In February 2014, Salčinović signed a contract to return to his home town to play for NK Čelik Zenica. In July 2014 he left Čelik, but came back to the club in January 2015, playing there until July 2020.

International career
Salčinović has one cap for the Bosnia and Herzegovina national football team, earned in a match against Japan on 30 January 2008 in which he came on for Mladen Žižović only 5 minutes before the final whistle.

References

External links

1987 births
Living people
Sportspeople from Zenica
Association football wingers
Bosnia and Herzegovina footballers
Bosnia and Herzegovina international footballers
NK Čelik Zenica players
Lech Poznań players
Sandefjord Fotball players
HŠK Zrinjski Mostar players
HNK Rijeka players
FK Olimpik players
Premier League of Bosnia and Herzegovina players
Eliteserien players
Croatian Football League players
Norwegian First Division players
Bosnia and Herzegovina expatriate footballers
Expatriate footballers in Poland
Bosnia and Herzegovina expatriate sportspeople in Poland
Expatriate footballers in Norway
Bosnia and Herzegovina expatriate sportspeople in Norway
Expatriate footballers in Croatia
Bosnia and Herzegovina expatriate sportspeople in Croatia